Statistics of Austrian Staatsliga A in the 1957–58 season.

Overview
It was contested by 14 teams, and Wiener Sportclub won the championship.

League standings

Results

References
Austria - List of final tables (RSSSF)

Austrian Football Bundesliga seasons
Austria
1957–58 in Austrian football